Xili railway station is a railway station in the Nanshan District, Shenzhen on the Pingnan Railway.

The station will be one of two terminals of the under construction Ganzhou–Shenzhen high-speed railway, the other being .

History
On September2, 2007, two empty freight carriages derailed at a switch beside the station. The carriages were damaged and services on the railway suspended. Repair works were completed and services resumed by the following day.

Metro station
It will be served by Line 13 of Shenzhen Metro.

References 

Railway stations in Guangdong